The Bishopric of Verdun was a state of the Holy Roman Empire. It was located at the western edge of the Empire and was bordered by France, the Duchy of Luxembourg, and the Duchy of Bar. Some time in the late 990s, the suzerainty of the County of Verdun passed from Herman of Ename of the House of Ardenne–Verdun to the Bishopric of Verdun.

History
This fief also included the advowson of the church of Verdun over its possessions along the river Moselle. According to a chronist's report, written around the year 900, the Merovingian king Childebert II (575–596) came to visit Verdun. There was not enough wine to serve the monarch and the Bishop Agericus was very embarrassed. However God rewarded him for his good deeds and miraculously increased the amount of wine. The king presented Agericus of Verdun with the Schloss Veldenz as a fief of Verdun "because of the wine". Around 1156 Frederick Barbarossa confirmed the holding by Bishop Albert I of Verdun of the castle together with the surrounding land.

A story that Peter (774-798), successor of Madalvaeus, was granted temporal lordship of the Diocese by Charlemagne, but this is no longer accepted.

This was continued to 1250 by a second monk, Lawrence, and later by an anonymous writer.

A key element of Emperor Otto I's domestic policy was to strengthen ecclesiastical authorities at the expense of the nobility who threatened his power. To this end he filled the ranks of the episcopate with his own relatives and with loyal chancery clerks. As protector of the Church he invested them with the symbols of their offices, both spiritual and secular, so the clerics were appointed as his vassals through a commendation ceremony. Historian Norman Cantor concludes: "Under these conditions clerical election became a mere formality in the Ottonian empire ..." The Bishop of Verdun, appointed by Otto, was totally faithful to the emperor.

In 990 Bishop Haimont ordered the construction of a new cathedral on the Romano-Rhenish plan: a nave, two transepts, two opposing apses, each one flanked by two bell towers. The Holy Roman Emperor Otto III bestowed the title Count on Bishop Haimont (990-1024) and his successors in 997.  The bishops had the right to appoint a temporary "count for life" (comte viager), theoretically subject to the authority of the bishop.  These counts were selected from the noble family of Ardennes.  There was frequent conflict between the count and the bishop.

With the marriage of Philip IV with Joan I of Navarre, the daughter of the Count of Champagne, Lorraine and particularly Verdun become a primary focus for the crown of France. After 1331, appointment to the episcopal see was controlled by the King of France rather than the Emperor.

The Bishopric was annexed to France in 1552; this was recognized by the Holy Roman Empire in the Peace of Westphalia of 1648. It then was a part of the province of the Three Bishoprics.

List of bishops and prince-bishops

Bishops
 ca. 346: St. Saintin
 356–383: St. Maurus
 ???–420: Salvinus
 ca. 440: Arator
 454–470: Polychronius
 470–486: Possessor
 486–502: Freminus (Firminus)
 502–529: Vitonus
 529–554: Desideratus
 554–591: Agericus
 v. 595: Charimeres
 v. 614: Harimeris
 ???–621: St. Ermenfred
 623–626: Godo
 641–648: Paulus
 648–665: Gisloald
 665–689: Gerebert
 689–701: Armonius
 701–710: Agrebert
 711–715: Bertalamius
 716: Abbo
 716–722: Pepo
 722–730: Volchisus
 730–732: Agronius
 753–774: Madalveus
 774–798: Peter
 798–802: Austram
 802–824: Heriland
 824–847: Hilduin
 847–870: Hatto
 870–879: Bernard
 880–923: Dado
 923–925: Hugh I
 925–939: Bernuin, son of Matfried I, Count of Metz, and of Lantesinde (sister of Dado)
 939–959: Berengar
 959–983: Wigfrid
 983–984: Hugh II
 984–984: Adalbero I, later Bishop of Metz (as Adalbero II). 
 985–990: Adalbero II, cousin of predecessor.

Prince-bishops
 990–1024: Haimont (Heymon)
 1024–1039: Reginbert
 1039–1046: Richard I
 1047–1089: Theoderic
 1089–1107: Richer
 1107–1114: Richard II of Grandpré
 1114–1117: Mazo, administrator
 1117–1129: Henry I of Blois, deposed at the Council of Chalon (1129)
 1129–1131: Ursio
 1131–1156: Adalbero III of Chiny
 1156–1162: Albert I of Marcey
 1163–1171: Richard III of Crisse
 1172–1181: Arnulf of Chiny-Verdun
 1181–1186: Henry II of Castel
 1186–1208: Albert II of Hierges
 1208–1216: Robert I of Grandpré
 1217–1224: John I of Aspremont
 1224–1245: Radulf of Torote
 1245–1245: Guy (Wido) I of Traignel
 1245–1247: Guy (Wido) II of Mellote
 1247–1252: John II of Aachen
 1252–1255: James (Jacques) I Pantaléon of Court-Palais
 1255–1271: Robert II of Médidan
 1271–1273: Ulrich of Sarvay
 1275–1278: Gerard of Grandson
 1278–1286: Henri of Grandson
 1289–1296: James (Jacques) II of Ruvigny
 1297–1302: John III of Richericourt
 1303–1305: Thomas of Blankenberg
 1305–1312: Nicholas I of Neuville
 1312–1349: Henry IV of Aspremont
 1349–1351: Otto of Poitiers
 1352–1361: Hugh III of Bar
 1362–1371: John IV of Bourbon-Montperoux
 1371–1375: John V of Dampierre-St. Dizier
 1375–1379: Guy III of Roye
 1380–1404: Leobald of Cousance
 1404–1419: John VI of Saarbrücken
 1419–1423: Louis I of Bar († 1430), administrator
 1423–1423: Raymond
 1423–1424: William of Montjoie
 1424–1430: Louis I of Bar († 1430), administrator
 1430–1437: Louis of Haraucourt
 1437–1449: William Fillatre
 1449–1456: Louis of Haraucourt
 1457–1500: William of Haraucourt
 1500–1508: Warry de Dommartin
 1508–1522: Louis de Lorraine
 1523–1544: Jean de Lorraine (1498–1550), brother of predecessor
 1544–1547: Nicolas de Mercœur (1524–1577), nephew of predecessor
 1548–1575: Nicolas Psaume. The Bishopric was annexed to France in 1552. This was not formally recognised in the Empire until the Peace of Westphalia in 1648.
 1576–1584: Nicolas Bousmard
 1585–1587: Charles de Lorraine
 1588–1593: Nicolas Boucher
 1593–1610: Eric of Lorraine
 1593–1601: Christophe de la Vallée, administrator
 1610–1622: Charles de Lorraine, nephew of predecessor

Bishops and French fiefs
 1623–1661: François de Lorraine (1599 † 1672), brother of predecessor
 1667–1679: Armand de Monchy d'Hocquincourt
 1681–1720: Hippolyte de Béthune
 1721–1754: Charles-François D'Hallencourt
 1754–1769: Aymar-Fr.-Chrétien-Mi. de Nicolai
 1770–1793: Henri-Louis Rene Desnos

Until 1801 Verdun was part of the ecclesiastical province of the Archbishop of Trier. On November 29, 1801 it was suppressed and added to the Diocese of Nancy. On October 6, 1822 the diocese was re-established.

See also
Roman Catholic Diocese of Verdun
Verdun Cathedral
Counts of Verdun

External links
Website of the diocese
Historia brevis episcoporum Virdunensium

Notes

 

990s establishments in the Holy Roman Empire
1552 disestablishments in the Holy Roman Empire
States and territories established in the 990s
Prince-bishoprics of the Holy Roman Empire
Prince-bishoprics of the Holy Roman Empire in France
997 establishments
Former monarchies of Europe

de:Bistum Verdun
fr:Diocèse de Verdun
it:Diocesi di Verdun